Ķūļciems parish is an administrative unit of the Talsi Municipality, Latvia.

Towns, villages and settlements of Ķūļciems parish 
 Ķūļciems
 Dzedri
 Krievragciems
 Jādekšas

References

Parishes of Latvia
Talsi Municipality